Marcel Faribault,  (October 8, 1908 – May 26, 1972) was a Canadian notary, businessman and administrator.

Background

Born in Montreal, he was the son of René Faribault and Anna Pauzé and was educated at the Université de Montréal. A successful notary, he became president of Trust Général du Canada. He died in Outremont, on May 26, 1972, and was interred in the Notre Dame des Neiges Cemetery.

Legislative Council of Quebec

He was appointed to the Legislative Council of Quebec by Premier Daniel Johnson Sr. in 1967 and supported the Union Nationale.

Federal politics

In the 1968 Canadian federal election, Faribault was the Quebec lieutenant to Progressive Conservative Party of Canada leader Robert Stanfield and an unsuccessful candidate in the Gamelin riding.

Honors

In 1971 he was made a Companion of the Order of Canada.

After his death in 1972, he was entombed at the Notre Dame des Neiges Cemetery in Montreal.

External links

References

1908 births
1972 deaths
Quebec notaries
Quebec lieutenants
Companions of the Order of Canada
Union Nationale (Quebec) MLCs
Politicians from Montreal
Quebec candidates for Member of Parliament
Progressive Conservative Party of Canada candidates for the Canadian House of Commons
Candidates in the 1968 Canadian federal election
Burials at Notre Dame des Neiges Cemetery